The Royal Collection of the British royal family is the largest private art collection in the world.

Spread among 13 occupied and historic royal residences in the United Kingdom, the collection is owned by King Charles III and overseen by the Royal Collection Trust. The British monarch owns some of the collection in right of the Crown and some as a private individual. It is made up of over one million objects, including 7,000 paintings, over 150,000 works on paper, this including 30,000 watercolours and drawings, and about 450,000 photographs, as well as around 700,000 works of art, including tapestries, furniture, ceramics, textiles, carriages, weapons, armour, jewellery, clocks, musical instruments, tableware, plants, manuscripts, books, and sculptures.

Some of the buildings which house the collection, such as Hampton Court Palace, are open to the public and not lived in by the Royal Family, whilst others, such as Windsor Castle and Kensington Palace, are both residences and open to the public. The Queen's Gallery at Buckingham Palace in London was built specially to exhibit pieces from the collection on a rotating basis. There is a similar art gallery next to the Palace of Holyroodhouse in Edinburgh, and a Drawings Gallery at Windsor Castle. The Crown Jewels are on public display in the Jewel House at the Tower of London.

About 3,000 objects are on loan to museums throughout the world, and many others are lent on a temporary basis to exhibitions.

History
Few items from before Henry VIII survive. The most important additions were made by Charles I, a passionate collector of Italian paintings and a major patron of Van Dyck and other Flemish artists. He purchased the bulk of the Gonzaga collection from the Duchy of Mantua. The entire Royal Collection, which included 1,500 paintings and 500 statues, was sold after Charles's execution in 1649. The 'Sale of the Late King's Goods' at Somerset House raised £185,000 for the English Republic. Other items were given away in lieu of payment to settle the king's debts. A number of pieces were recovered by Charles II after the Restoration of the monarchy in 1660, and they form the basis for the collection today. The Dutch Republic also presented Charles with the Dutch Gift of 28 paintings, 12 sculptures, and a selection of furniture. He went on to buy many paintings and other works.

George III was mainly responsible for forming the collection's outstanding holdings of Old Master drawings; large numbers of these, and many Venetian paintings including over 40 Canalettos, joined the collection when he bought the collection of Joseph "Consul Smith", which also included a large number of books. Many other drawings were bought from Alessandro Albani, cardinal and art dealer in Rome.

George IV shared Charles I's enthusiasm for collecting, buying up large numbers of Dutch Golden Age paintings and their Flemish contemporaries. Like other English collectors, he took advantage of the great quantities of French decorative art on the London market after the French Revolution, and is mostly responsible for the collection's outstanding holdings of 18th-century French furniture and porcelain, especially Sèvres. He also bought much contemporary English silver, and many recent and contemporary English paintings. Queen Victoria and her husband Albert were keen collectors of contemporary and old master paintings.

Many objects have been given from the collection to museums, especially by George III and Victoria and Albert. In particular, the King's Library formed by George III with the assistance of his librarian Frederick Augusta Barnard, consisting of 65,000 printed books, was given to the British Museum, now the British Library, where they remain as a distinct collection. He also donated the "Old Royal Library" of some 2,000 manuscripts, which are still segregated as the Royal manuscripts. The core of this collection was the purchase by James I of the related collections of Humphrey Llwyd, Lord Lumley, and the Earl of Arundel. Prince Albert's will requested the donation of a number of mostly early paintings to the National Gallery, London, which Queen Victoria fulfilled.

Modern era
Throughout the reign of Elizabeth II (1952–2022), there were significant additions to the collection through judicious purchases, bequests, and gifts from nation states and official bodies. Since 1952, approximately 2,500 works have been added to the Royal Collection. The Commonwealth is strongly represented in this manner: an example is 75 contemporary Canadian watercolours that entered the collection between 1985 and 2001 as a gift from the Canadian Society of Painters in Water Colour. Modern art acquired by Elizabeth II includes pieces by Sir Anish Kapoor, Lucian Freud, and Andy Warhol. In 2002 it was revealed that 20 paintings (excluding works on paper) were acquired by the Queen in the first 50 years of her reign, mostly portraits of previous monarchs or their close relatives. Eight were purchased at auction, six bought from dealers, three commissioned, two donated or bequeathed, and one was a purchase from Winchester Cathedral.

In 1987 a new department of the Royal Household was established to oversee the Royal Collection, and it was financed by the commercial activities of Royal Collection Enterprises, a limited company. Before then, it was maintained using the monarch's official income paid by the Civil List. Since 1993 the collection has been funded by entrance fees to Windsor Castle and Buckingham Palace.

Collection

A computerised inventory of the collection was started in early 1991, and it was completed in December 1997. The full inventory is not available to the public, though catalogues of parts of the collection – especially paintings – have been published, and a searchable database on the Royal Collection website is increasingly comprehensive, with "271,697 items found" by late 2020.

About a third of the 7,000 paintings in the collection are on view or stored at buildings in London which fall under the remit of the Historic Royal Palaces agency: the Tower of London, Hampton Court Palace, Kensington Palace, Banqueting House (Whitehall), and Kew Palace. The Jewel House and Martin Tower at the Tower of London also house the Crown Jewels. A rotating selection of art, furniture, jewellery, and other items considered to be of the highest quality is shown at the Queen's Gallery, a purpose-built exhibition centre near Buckingham Palace. Many objects are displayed in the palace itself, the state rooms of which are open to visitors for much of the year, as well as in Windsor Castle, Holyrood Palace in Edinburgh, the Royal Pavilion in Brighton, and Osborne House on the Isle of Wight. Some works are on long-term or permanent loan to museums and other places; the most famous of these are the Raphael Cartoons, in the Victoria and Albert Museum in London since 1865.

Paintings, prints and drawings

The collection's holdings of Western fine art are among the largest and most important assemblages in existence, with works of the highest quality, and in many cases artists whose works cannot be fully understood without a study of the holdings contained within the Royal Collection. There are over 7,000 paintings, spread across the Royal residences and palaces. The collection does not claim to provide a comprehensive, chronological survey of Western fine art but it has been shaped by the individual tastes of kings, queens and their families over the last 500 years.

The prints and drawings collection is based in the Print Room, Windsor, and is exceptionally strong, with famous holdings of drawings by Leonardo da Vinci (550), Raphael, Michelangelo and Hans Holbein the Younger (85). A large part of the Old Master drawings were acquired by George III. Starting in early 2019, 144 of Leonardo da Vinci's drawings from the Collection went on display in 12 locations in the UK. From May to October that year, 200 of the drawings were on display in the Queen's Gallery at Buckingham Palace.

Furniture
Numbering over 300 items, the Royal Collection holds one of the greatest and most important collections of French furniture ever assembled. The collection is noted for its encyclopedic range as well as counting the greatest cabinet-makers of the Ancien Régime.

Sculpture and decorative arts

Costume

The collection has a number of items of clothing, including those worn by members of the Royal family, especially female members, some going back to the early 19th century. These include ceremonial dress and several wedding dresses, including that of Queen Victoria (1840). There are also servant's livery uniforms, and a number of exotic pieces presented over the years, going back to a "war coat" of Tipu Sultan (d. 1799). In recent years these have featured more prominently in displays and exhibitions, and are popular with the public.

Gems and Jewels
A collection of 277 cameos, intaglios, badges of insignia, snuff boxes and pieces of jewellery known as the Gems and Jewels are kept at Windsor Castle. Separate from Elizabeth II's jewels and the Crown Jewels, 24 pre-date the Renaissance and the rest were made in the 16th–19th centuries. In 1862, it was first shown publicly at the South Kensington Museum, now the Victoria and Albert Museum. Several objects were removed and others added in the second half of the Victorian period. An inventory of the collection was made in 1872, and a catalogue, Ancient and Modern Gems and Jewels in the Collection of Her Majesty The Queen, was published in 2008 by the Royal Collection Trust.

Ownership
The Royal Collection is privately owned, although some of the works are displayed in areas of palaces and other royal residences open to visitors for the public to enjoy. Some of the collection is owned by the monarch personally, and everything else is described as being held in trust by the monarch in right of the Crown. It is understood that works of art acquired by monarchs up to the death of Queen Victoria in 1901 are heirlooms which fall into the latter category. Items the British royal family acquired later, including official gifts, can be added to that part of the collection by a monarch at their sole discretion. Ambiguity surrounds the status of objects that came into the possession of Elizabeth II during her 70-year reign. The Royal Collection Trust has confirmed that all pieces left to her by the Queen Mother, which included works by Monet, Nash, and Fabergé, belonged to her personally. It was also confirmed that she owned the Royal stamp collection, inherited from her father George VI, as a private individual.

Non-personal items are said to be inalienable as they can only be willed to the monarch's successor. The legal accuracy of this claim has never been substantiated in court. According to Cameron Cobbold, then Lord Chamberlain, speaking in 1971, minor items have occasionally been sold to help raise money for acquisitions, and duplicates of items are given away as presents within the Commonwealth. In 1995, Iain Sproat, then Secretary of State for National Heritage, told the House of Commons that selling objects was "entirely a matter for the Queen". In a 2000 television interview, the Duke of Edinburgh said that the monarch was "technically, perfectly at liberty to sell them".

Hypothetical questions have been asked in Parliament about what should happen to the collection if the UK ever becomes a republic. In other European countries, the art collections of deposed monarchies usually have been taken into state ownership or become part of other national collections held in trust for the public's enjoyment. Under the European Convention on Human Rights, incorporated into British law in 1998, the monarch may have to be compensated for the loss of any assets held in right of the Crown unless he or she agreed to surrender them voluntarily.

Management

A registered charity, the Royal Collection Trust was set up in 1993 after the Windsor Castle fire with a mandate to conserve the works and enhance the public's appreciation and understanding of art. It employs around 500 staff and is one of the five departments of the Royal Household. Buildings do not come under its remit. In 2012, the team of curatorial staff numbered 29, and there were 32 conservationists. Income is raised by charging entrance fees to see the collection at various locations and selling books and merchandise to the public. The Trust is financially independent and receives no Government funding or public subsidy. A studio at Marlborough House is responsible for the conservation of furniture and decorative objects.

Owing to the COVID-19 pandemic, the Trust lost £64 million during 2020 and announced 130 redundancies, including the roles of Surveyor of the Queen's Pictures and Surveyor of the Queen's Works of Art.

The Royal Collection Trust is a company limited by guarantee, registered in England and Wales, and a Registered Charity.  On its website, the Trust describes its purpose as overseeing the "maintenance and conservation of the Royal Collection, subject to proper custodial control in the service of the Queen and the nation." It also deals with acquisitions for the Royal Collection, and the display of the Royal Collection to the public.

Board of Trustees

The Board of Trustees includes the following officers of the Royal Household: the Lord Chamberlain, the Private Secretary to the Sovereign and the Keeper of the Privy Purse. Other Trustees are appointed for their knowledge and expertise in areas relevant to the charity's activities. Currently, the trustees are:

James Leigh-Pemberton (Chairman)
Marc Bolland (Deputy Chairman)
Brian Ivory
Tony Johnstone-Burt
Anna Keay
Tonya Nelson
Monisha Shah
Lord Parker of Minsmere (Lord Chamberlain)
Michael Stevens (Keeper of the Privy Purse)
Edward Young (Private Secretary to the Sovereign)

Management Board

The Management Board is the committee responsible for the day-to-day running of the Royal Collection. It is appointed by the Board of Trustees.

It consists of:

Tim Knox (Director of the Royal Collection)
Keith Harrison (Finance Director)
Michelle Lockhart (Commercial Director)

Gallery

See also
Arts Council Collection
Crown Collection
Government Art Collection
Portland Collection
Royal Philatelic Collection
Surveyor of the Queen's Pictures
Surveyor of the Queen's Works of Art
Wallace Collection

Notes

References

Bibliography

Lloyd, Christopher (1991), The Queen's Pictures, Royal Collectors through the centuries, National Gallery Publications, .

Further reading

External links

YouTube channel
Vimeo channel

British monarchy
 
British royal family
Private art collections
Art collections in the United Kingdom
Material culture of royal courts